Roy Edwin McAuley is an American academic and former President of Elizabethtown College.

McAuley served as dean from 1956 to 1961. McAuley became President of Elizabethtown College in 1961 until 1966.

References

Presidents of Elizabethtown College
Year of birth missing (living people)
Living people